The 2013 UAE Super Cup was the 12th and the 6th Professional UAE Super Cup, held at the Mohammed Bin Zayed Stadium, Abu Dhabi on 30 August 2013 between Al Ain, winners of the 2012–13 UAE Pro-League and 2012–13 UAE President's Cup winners Al Ahli. Al Ahli won the game 3–2 on penalties.

Details

See also
2013–14 UAE Pro-League
2012–13 UAE President's Cup
2013–14 Al Ain FC season

References

External links

UAE Super Cup
Al Ain FC matches
Al Ahli Club (Dubai) matches
UAE Super Cup seasons